Eyüp is a Turkish given name for males and a variant of the name Job. People named Eyüp include:

 Eyüp Sabri Akgöl (1876-1950), Ottoman revolutionary and Turkish politician 
 Eyüp Aşık (born 1953), Turkish former politician
 Eyüp Can (boxer) (born 1964), Turkish retired boxer
 Eyüp Can (journalist) (born 1973), Turkish journalist
 Abu Ayyub al-Ansari, a companion (sahaba) of Muhammad, known in Turkish as Eyüp Sultan

See also 
 Eyüboğlu (disambiguation)

Turkish masculine given names